The Széchenyi mansion is a historic mansion in Nagycenk, Hungary. 

It was built in the Baroque style by the Széchenyi family through consecutive generations. Today, it serves as a memorial museum of István Széchenyi, its most famous resident.

References

External links 

Széchenyi family
Museums in Győr-Moson-Sopron County
Biographical museums in Hungary
Historic house museums in Hungary